Temagami, formerly spelled Timagami, is a municipality in northeastern Ontario, Canada, in the Nipissing District with Lake Temagami at its heart.

The Temagami region is known as n'Daki Menan, the homeland of the area's First Nations community, most of whom are Anishinaabe (Ojibwe), living on Bear Island. The official name for this group is the Temagami First Nation. However, a larger group that includes these people, plus non-status residents and some non-residents is called the Teme-Augama Anishnabai.

It is also known as the staging point for cottage vacationing and wilderness canoeing trips on Lake Temagami, in Lady Evelyn-Smoothwater Provincial Park, and vast tracts of wilderness in the area. There are several outfitters here that cater to outdoor activity.

The community is home to the Finlayson Point Provincial Park, which itself offers access to Lake Temagami. An excellent view of the entire Temagami area is offered by the Temagami Fire Tower on Caribou Mountain, a renovated -tall fire lookout tower that visitors can climb free of charge. The Temagami Fire Tower was last used in the 1970s to spot fires.

The Municipality of Temagami also includes the communities of Lake Temagami, Marten River, and Temagami North.

History

Anishnabai legends describe them migrating from the east coast of North America after a warning from prophets concerning the arrival of a danger from the east. The land was divided into familial hunting and trapping territories.

Since the main east-west fur trade route bypassed Temagami to the south, settlement of this area by Europeans did not come until 1834. That year the Hudson's Bay Company built a store on Temagami Island, which later relocated to Bear Island. The town itself was founded by Dan O'Connor, who in 1903 formed the O'Connor Steamboat and Hotel Company on the lake and established its first store on the future townsite. By 1906, he had built three hotels on Lake Temagami: Hotel Ronnoco, Temagami Inn, and Lady Evelyn Hotel and by 1910 the company operated ten steamships on the lake including the Belle of Temagami.

Discoveries of gold, copper, nickel, and particularly silver in 1903, brought mining to nearby Cobalt and accelerated development of the region. Several mines opened in Temagami, including Big Dan Mine, Little Dan Mine, Barton Mine, Hermiston-McCauley Mine, Temagami-Lorrain Mine, Priest Mine, Beanland Mine, Sherman Mine, Kanichee Mine, Northland Pyrite Mine and Copperfields Mine, which once mined the richest copper ore in Canada.

The Forest Reserves Act of 1898 established the  Temagami Forest Reserve. Because of this reserve, the region was home to the last Old-growth forests in Ontario. Logging of the vast pine stands only began in the 1920s. Now just a few patches of old growth remain, including the White Bear Forest and the world's largest stand of old-growth red and white pine forest - the Obabika Old-Growth Forest or Wakimika Triangle Forest part of the Obabika River Waterway Provincial Park. This has led to confrontation in recent years between loggers and environmentalists when new logging access roads are built or major logging operations are proposed. Access to many old-growth areas is provided on local hiking trails and canoe routes.

The inspiration and wonder of the area were brought to millions around the world in 1907 when Grey Owl arrived in Temagami. He was employed by Keewaydin Canoe Camp as a guide, and later by the Ontario Department of Lands and Forests as a ranger. His subsequent books and extensive lecturing in Britain and the United States brought tremendous attention to northeastern Ontario and wildlife conservation.

In 1968, Temagami was incorporated, first as an Improvement District, and 10 years later as a Township, consisting of the geographic townships of Strathy and Strathcona, together with parts of Briggs, Chambers, Best, Cassels, and Yates townships.

The Attorney General of Ontario pursued legal action against the Band for this caution. The TAA lost this court case in 1984 and the Band proceeded with an appeal to the Supreme Court of Canada. The Band lost this appeal and eventually the caution was lifted.

In 1988, the Ontario Minister of Natural Resources, Vince Kerrio approved the expansion of the Red Squirrel Road, directly through Anishnabe territory. This prompted a series of roadblocks by the TAA and by the Temagami Wilderness Society in 1988-1989. The Temagami First Nation's former chief Gary Potts was the leader of the TAA blockades. In 1991 the TAA and the Ontario government created the Wendaban Stewardship Authority to decide what to do with the four townships near the logging road.

On January 1, 1998, the Township of Temagami was greatly enlarged through the merger with 17 unincorporated townships and became the Municipality of Temagami with town status.

Transportation

Rail

In the summer of 1905, the Temiskaming and Northern Ontario Railway (now the Ontario Northland Railway) was completed from North Bay to New Liskeard and allowed direct access to the area and the Clay Belt around Lake Timiskaming, opening up the region to settlement and development. The original Temagami station, which opened in 1907, burnt down in 1909 and was rebuilt.

Temagami station was a stop on the Northlander railway service before it was cancelled in 2012.

Bus
Temagami is served by Ontario Northland's intercity motor coach service along its North Bay–Hearst route, which also serves many communities along the former Northlander route.

There is currently no local bus service in Temagami.

Geography

The Temagami land is part of the Canadian Shield, one of the largest single exposure of Precambrian rocks in the world which were formed after the Earth's crust cooled. Temagami land has striking similarities to the Sudbury Structure, which is one of the richest mining camps in the world. The hills in the Temagami area are remnants of the oldest mountain ranges in North America that date back during the Precambrian era. These enormous mountains were taller than any that exist today. The uplifting was accomplished as enormous pressure caused the earth to buckle in a process called folding. Other processes, such as volcanic activity and geologic faulting in which the earth cracks open also contributed to the formation of these mountains. Over millions of years, these enormous mountains were gradually eroded to the land we know today in Temagami.

The rocks that form Temagami to this day are igneous, metamorphic and sedimentary rock. The Temagami area has good potential to host diamondiferous kimberlites and more diamond bearing kimberlites may continue to be discovered in the area. The Temagami area also contains some pillow lava about 2 billion years old, indicating that great submarine volcanoes existed during the early stages of the formation of the Earth's crust.

There are a number of northwest trending faults in the Temagami East claim block area and are associated with the Saint Lawrence rift system and remains seismically active. The most recently felt earthquake in the Temagami area occurred in the year 2000.

Minerals in the Temagami area include aragonite, brochantite, calcite, Chalcopyrite, jasper, magnetite, molybdenite, pentlandite, pyrite, pyrrhotite, serpentine, and talc. A bright white palladium mercury telluride mineral was discovered on Temagami Island in 1973 called temagamite, named after its discovery locality in Copperfields Mine, originally known as Temagami Mine.

Temagami provides rugged topography, which is excellent for canoeing and hiking. There are numerous viewpoints in the municipality, including High Rock and Caribou Mountain, which contains a  fire tower on its summit.

Lakes

Lakes located within the Municipality of Temagami include:

Angus Lake
Anima Nipissing Lake
Arsenic Lake
Blueberry Lake
Brophy Lake
Cassels Lake
Chambers Lake
Cross Lake
Duncan Lake
Gull Lake
Herridge Lake
Ingall Lake
James Lake
Jumping Cariboo Lake
Lake Temagami
Link Lake
Lowell Lake
Lower Redwater Lake
Lower Twin Lake
Martin Lake
Net Lake
Obabika Lake
Obashkong Lake
Poison Pond
Rabbit Lake
Rib Lake
Red Squirrel Lake
Snake Island Lake
Snowshoe Lake
Tent Lake
Tetapaga Lake
Turtle Lake
Upper Redwater Lake
Upper Twin Lake
Wasaksina Lake
Wilson Lake

Localities
Localities located within Temagami's municipal boundaries are:

Settlements

Bear Island
Doherty
Gillies Townsite
Kitts Trailer Park
Marten River
Milne Townsite
Owaissa
Redwater
Temagami
Temagami North

Townships

Askin Township
Aston Township
Banting Township
Belfast Township
Best Township
Briggs Township
Canton Township
Cassels Township
Chambers Township
Cynthia Township
Joan Township
Law Township
LeRoche Township
Milne Township
Olive Township
Phyllis Township
Riddell Township
Sisk Township
Strathcona Township
Strathy Township
Torrington Township
Vogt Township
Yates Township

Note: Only the eastern halves of Scholes and Clement townships are within the municipality of Temagami.

Camps
Camps include:

Camp Acouchiching
Camp Agamik
Camp Bigwee
Camp Cayuga
Camp Chimo
Camp Cochrane
Keewaydin
Northwoods Camp
Camp Wabikon
Camp Wabun
Camp Wanapitei
Camp White Bear
Camp Temagami (formerly Camp Wigwasati, formerly Camp Pays D'en Haut)
Northwaters and Langskib Wilderness Programs

Demographics 

Film and television
Temagami and surrounding areas have been used as a location to shoot feature films and TV episodes. Films include the 1930 docudrama The Silent Enemy and from 2006 That Beautiful Somewhere. TV includes Survivorman episodes (Plane Crash, and Temagami Hunting Deep Woods) and Mantracker episodes (Ryder and Brendyn, and Ben and Darrell).

Notable people
Benjamin Chee Chee, Canadian artist of Ojibwe descent
Grey Owl, British-born Archibald Belaney who pretended to be First Nations
Dan O'Connor, Canadian politician, businessman and prospector, founded the community
Gary Potts, former chief of the Temagami First Nation and the Teme-Augama Anishnabai

See also
List of mines in Temagami

References

Further reading
Brian Back, The Keewaydin Way: The story of the world's oldest canoe-trip camp, 2nd edition, 2004.
Matt Bray and Ashley Thomson, Temagami: A Debate on Wilderness
Bruce Hodgins and Jamie Benidickson, The Temagami Experience: Recreation, Resources, and Aboriginal Rights in the Northern Ontario Wilderness, 1989.
Bruce Hodgins, Ute Lischke and David T. McNab, Blockades and Resistance: Studies in Actions of Peace and the Temagami Blockades of 1988-1989
Hap Wilson, Temagami Canoe Routes, 7th edition 1992, 
Temagami Integrated Planning Background Information, 2005, Online version

External links

Temagami
Hudson's Bay Company trading posts
Mining communities in Ontario
Single-tier municipalities in Ontario
Strathy Township